The Rockford Symphony Orchestra is a symphony orchestra in Rockford, Illinois, USA. Now in its 80th season, the orchestra is the third largest orchestra in the state of Illinois.

History
The Rockford Symphony Orchestra, incorporated in 1943, began performing concerts in 1934 under the direction of Andreas Fugmann, the head of Rockford College music department led th orchestra until 1940. The orchestra took a hiatus during World War II and resumed in March 1943 under the direction of Arthur Zack. Zack led the then civic orchestra until music director and Manager until May 1970. Following Zack's tenure, Dr. Crawford Gates was appointed music director of the Orchestra. During his tenure, the orchestra began to bring in more guest artists and professional musicians.

When Gates retired, Charles Bornstein was named the music director of the orchestra (1986).  Bornstein's tenure was not without controversy. While his artistic vision for the orchestra was certainly high, many felt that he lacked "people skills" in dealing with orchestral personnel. There was, during this time, a large attrition rate of long term orchestra members.

The Rockford Symphony Orchestra is one of the leading cultural  institutions in Northern Illinois, performing over sixteen concerts annually. The RSO was founded in 1934 to celebrate Rockford's centennial anniversary, and incorporated in 1943. The RSO's first music director and Manager, Arthur Zack, led the orchestra for twenty-seven years. During this time, the Rockford Area Youth Symphony Orchestra and the Rockford Symphony Orchestra Guild were established. The RSO continues its commitment to fulfilling its mission to lead in the creation of vibrant music experiences that enlighten, educate, and entertain.

In 1970, the Board of Directors appointed Crawford Gates as the next music director. He brought renowned guest artists to perform with the orchestra including Van Cliburn (1972), Victor Borge (1973), Phyllis Diller (1974), and Benny Goodman (1975). Upon the retirement of Crawford Gates, the RSO Board named Charles Bornstein as music director in 1986. Bornstein's intellectual and artistic vision was characteristic of his tenure.

In 1991, the Board named Steven Larsen as the RSO's fourth music director. Described as a “Renaissance musician,” Larsen went to work and expanded the orchestra's repertoire, attracting musicians of the highest caliber. The RSO has hosted such notable classical and pops artists as Peter Schickele, Rick Nielsen, Dionne Warwick, Andre Watts, Eugene Fodor, Itzhak Perlman, Yo Yo Ma, Rachel Barton Pine, Alon Goldstein, Daniel Rodriguez, and Stefan Jackiw. During his tenure, Larsen added a pops series, an outdoor summer performance series and youth concerts to the Symphony's concert rosters. Through creative and  innovative programming Maestro Larsen has endeavored to bring the RSO's  performances to wider audiences by performing in new and non-traditional venues. His accomplishments have been recognized through numerous awards, including the Illinois Council of Orchestras’ 2006 Conductor of the Year and the 1999 Mayor's Arts Award for individual achievement.

Under Larsen's artistic leadership, the orchestra continues to develop the audiences of tomorrow through a wide variety of other educational programs involving the entire Rockford community. Continuing to reach out to more people in our community, the RSO frequently  performs in collaborations with other community arts organizations, such as the Rockford Dance Company; Mendelssohn Chorale; Kantorei, the Singing Boys of Rockford; Rock Valley College; Highland Community  College; and collaborates on education programs with the Rockford Art  Museum and the Rockford Area Arts Council. In past years, the RSO has performed special concerts in area communities such as Freeport, Dixon,  Belvidere, and Roscoe. In addition, radio audiences throughout Northern Illinois enjoy delayed broadcasts of all RSO Classic Series concerts on WNIU 89.5 FM, reaching more than 50,000 listeners six times a year.

The RSO offices are located in the Riverfront Museum Park. The orchestra performs in the Coronado Performing Arts Center, originally constructed as a 1927 atmospheric movie palace. This state-of-the-art  facility boasts a large stage and orchestra pit, 2,200 seats, a fully  restored interior, an acoustical enhancement system, and full accessibility for audience members with special needs.

Musical director
Steve Larsen was named the fourth music director of the orchestra in 1991.  Under his direction, and with the board's vision, the RSO has expanded the orchestra's repertoire and attracted musicians of the highest caliber.  In addition to an expanded "classics series", the RSO has added/increased the pop series, youth education programs, a summer music series, and fully staged operas.

Steven Larsen marks his 30th season with the Rockford Symphony Orchestra. During this tenure the orchestra has flourished and grown to become the third largest symphony orchestra in Illinois. His energetic leadership earned two “Orchestra of the Year” awards to the Rockford Symphony Orchestra and three “Conductor of the Year” awards for himself, the most recent in 2016. Critics have praised his ease with all ranges of musical styles and periods, his sense of line and dramatic tension, and his ability to bring new life to familiar music. Audiences respond warmly to his informal podium style and enjoy his enthusiastic desire to communicate his love for music.

Larsen is a native of Chicago, where he attended the American Conservatory of Music, receiving a degree in music theory and composition. As his interests in conducting grew, he auditioned for the graduate program at Northwestern University, earning an assistantship and leading to studies with Margaret Hillis and Bernard Rubenstein. He received that school's first M.M. in orchestral conducting in 1976. In 1979 he was the only American to be awarded a fellowship in the prestigious Netherlands Broadcasting Company Conductors Course, leading to continued studies with the late Russian conductor Kyrill Kondrashin. In 1981 he was invited to participate in the first Conductors Institute, held in Morgantown, West Virginia, as a conducting fellow.

A significant portion of his career has been devoted to opera. For 13 years, he was resident conductor and Artistic Administrator of Chicago Opera Theater, where he also produced the New Opera Workshop. He has guest conducted for opera companies in Chicago, Detroit, Minneapolis, Honolulu, Cleveland, Westchester (NY), and Dayton (OH), returning to Dayton for a season as Interim General Director. For three years he was Principal Conductor for Opera Theater of San Antonio.

His many symphonic guest conducting engagements include the State Orchestra of Mexico; the Camerata Polifonica Siciliana in Catania, Italy; the Milwaukee Symphony, Grant Park Symphony and Tulsa Philharmonic, as well as leading several children's concerts with the Chicago Symphony. In 2012 he traveled to Prague to conduct the Hradec Králové Philharmonic.

He has received the “Star of Excellence” Award from the Mendelssohn Performing Arts Center, the “Mayor’s Arts Award for Distinguished Service by an Individual”, and the “Distinguished Service” Award from the Rockford Park District.

Music Director Search 2022 
January 2022 marks the start of the search for a new music director for the Rockford Symphony Orchestra. With nine highly qualified finalists, the symphony is set to experience some amazing performances. The winner will be announced in December 2022, with their tenure beginning in January 2023.

Finalists:

 Yaniv Attar
 Andrew Crust
 Eric Garcia
 Tania Miller
 Radu Paponiu
 Yaniv Segal
 Scott Terrell
 Vlad Vizireanu
 Alastair Willis

Awards
(Presented by the Illinois Council of Orchestras)
2016,  Illinois Conductor of the Year, Steve Larsen
2009, General Manager of the Year, Brian Ritter
2008, Programming of the Year
2007, Illinois Orchestra of the Year
2006, Illinois Conductor of the Year, Steve Larsen
1999, Illinois Conductor of the Year, Steve Larsen
1992, Illinois Orchestra of the Year

Musicians 
The Rockford Symphony Orchestra boasts musicians from Illinois, Wisconsin, Iowa, Indiana and Michigan. All musicians are hired on a year-long contract with many sponsored chairs. For a full listing of personnel, please visit the RSO website here.

Performance venue
The RSO performs at the renovated Coronado Performing Arts Center, in downtown Rockford, Illinois.

The Coronado opened on October 9, 1927, as an atmospheric style theatre and movie palace - complete with Spanish castles, Italian villas, oriental dragons, starlit skies and a Grande Barton Pipe Organ.  Countless show business legends, including the Marx Brothers, Tommy  Dorsey, Frank Sinatra, Louis Armstrong, George Gershwin, Bob Hope, Sammy Davis, Jr., and Gypsy Rose Lee have performed on the Coronado stage.

The Coronado was the romantic setting for countless movie-going couples on their first date, and a Saturday outing for kids watching cartoons and movies through 1984. Over the years, the theatre has also played host to high school graduations, political rallies and community events.

After decades of use, the Coronado received a much needed facelift  between 1999 and 2001, with the community-wide support of the city of Rockford, individuals and corporations. Spear-headed by the Friends of the Coronado, a non-profit organization formed in 1997, the theatre was reborn in January, 2001 in its original grand style as a state-of-the-art performance and entertainment facility after an $18.5  million restoration.

Rockford Symphony Youth Orchestra (RSYO)
The orchestra, with roughly sixty members, rehearses weekly and performs throughout the year. RSYO is currently under the direction of Linc Smelser.

Citation
 Rockford Symphony Orchestra, The First 80 Years, published in April 2015.  Written by Michele McAffee

Specific

Musical groups established in 1934
Orchestras based in Illinois
Rockford, Illinois
1934 establishments in Illinois